The frontal crest is a ridge on the internal surface of the squamous part of the frontal bone formed by the inferior convergence of the two edges of the sagittal sulcus. The frontal crest gives attachment to the falx cerebri.

References 

Bones of the head and neck